Ethel Post-Parrish (died 1960) was an American Spiritualist medium.

Biography
In 1932 Parrish founded Camp Silver Belle a Spiritualist summer camp situated at Mountain Springs Hotel in Ephrata, Pennsylvania. In her séances Parrish claimed to materialize her spirit guide an Indian girl known as Silver Belle.

In a séance at Ephrata, Pennsylvania, in 1953, Parrish materialized her spirit guide Silver Belle whilst sitting in her curtained cabinet. The pictures claimed to be taken at 50 second intervals in infra-red light by photographer Jack Edwards, show Silver Belle growing from a cloud of "ectoplasm".

Fraud
A related spiritualist camp known as Camp Chesterfield in Anderson, Indiana was managed by Mabel Riffle the cousin of Parrish. The camp was exposed in 1960 as infra red film had revealed that the materialized figures were all human and had entered the séance room through a side door.

Camp Silver Belle was also practicing fraudulent mediumship, and had been exposed in various newspapers. Before exposures the camp took in up to a million dollars a year.

The photographs taken by Jack Edwards of Silver Belle materializing were discovered to be a hoax. A photograph was taken of smoke and by a double exposure a cardboard figure was superimposed onto it. The woman standing outside the cabinet curtain was also an accomplice involved in the deception.

Footnotes

1960 deaths
Year of birth missing
American spiritual mediums
People from Ephrata, Pennsylvania